, abbreviated to , is a Japanese national university located in Fukuoka, on the island of Kyushu.

It was the 4th Imperial University in Japan, ranked as 6th in 2020 Times Higher Education Japan University Rankings, one of the top 10 Designated National University and selected as a Top Type university of Top Global University Project by the Japanese government. Kyudai is considered one of the most prestigious research-oriented universities in Japan and is a member of the Alliance of Asian Liberal Arts Universities along with the University of Tokyo, Waseda University, Peking University and others.

The history of Kyushu University can be traced back to the medical schools of the Fukuoka Domain (福岡藩 Fukuoka han) established in 1867. The school was reorganized to Fukuoka Medical College of Kyoto Imperial University in 1903 and became independent as Kyushu Imperial University in 1911. Albert Einstein visited the university on December 25, 1922.

There are 2,089 foreign students enrolled in the university. It was chosen for the Global 30 university program, and has been selected to the top 13 global university project.

Symbol 

Kyushu University does not have an official school song, instead, it has one cheering song and three student songs including Matssubara-ni, with lyrics by Yoshifumi Akiyama.

The university's logo features a background of pine needles inset with an older iterance of the kanji for "university". The logo was officially established in 2004, but was originally proposed by a student, Sou Yoshihide, in the mid-20th century, and was used then on from 1950. There have also been alternatives designs, such as those featuring the Japanese KU or Q, for Kyushu instead of "university".

Global 30 Project 
On July 3, 2009, Kyushu University was chosen for the “Global 30 (G30) Project”.

Short-term programs 
Japan in Today's World "JTW"
ASEAN in Today's World (AsTW)

Kyushu University Hospital

History 
Kyushu University is one of the seven former Imperial Universities created in the Meiji period. The university is the largest research university in the Kyushu region with research centers in eleven different academic faculties, including the humanities, social sciences, medicine, and science.

Kyushu University Hospital is affiliated with the Faculty of Medical Sciences, the Faculty of Dental Science, and the Faculty of Pharmaceutical Sciences.

1867: The Kuroda Clan establishes an institution for Western medicine (Sanseikan) for the children of the lord and their retainers. The roots of present-day Kyushu University Hospital can be traced back to the clinic affiliated with that school.
1879: At the beginning of the Meiji period the clinic becomes an affiliated hospital of Fukuoka Prefectural Medical School.
1903: Fukuoka Medical College, a branch school of Kyoto Imperial University is established, and the hospital becomes affiliated with that school.
1911: Kyushu Imperial University is established in Fukuoka, and this hospital becomes affiliated with the university's Faculty of Medicine.
1931: The Research Institute of Balneotherapeutics is established in Beppu, Ōita Prefecture.
1947: Following the university reform that took place after World War II, the hospital's name was changed to the Kyushu University Faculty of Medical Sciences Affiliated Hospital. Fifteen departments, including a dental department, were established.
1967: The Faculty of Dental Science becomes an independent facility. The Faculty of Dental Science Affiliated Hospital opens.
2002: The new master plan for Ito campus was designed by César Pelli, Kisho Kurokawa (黒川紀章).
2003: The three hospitals affiliated with Faculty of Medical Sciences, Faculty of Dental Science and Medical Institute of Bioregulation merge to form Kyushu University Hospital.
2009: Plans for the construction of a new hospital, which began in 2000, are completed. The new hospital consists of a South Ward, North Ward, West Ward and Outpatient Ward.

War Crimes 
1945: Surviving crewmen from a downed American B-29 were subjected to fatal medical experiments and vivisection conducted by members of the university's medical faculty. While still alive, the POWs were vivisected, portions of their vital organs were removed, holes were drilled into their skulls and sea water was pumped into their bloodstreams. None of the POWs survived the experiments. Members of the faculty and administration were later tried and convicted of war crimes.

Academic rankings

General rankings
The university has been ranked 5th in the 2020 Times Higher Education Japan University Rankings, which is one rank down from 2019. In another ranking, Japanese prep school Kawaijuku ranked Kyushu as the 7th best university in Japan.

It has been ranked 132nd in the 2020 QS World University Rankings, and 401-500th in the Times Higher Education World University Rankings.

According to QS, its subject rankings were: 123rd in Engineering & IT, 170th in Life Sciences & Biomedicine, and 150th in Natural Sciences. It is also the 18th best university in Asia, according to QS Asian University rankings.

Research performance
Kyushu is one of the top research institutions in Japan. According to Thomson Reuters, Kyushu is the 6th best research university in Japan. Its research excellence is especially distinctive in Materials Science (6th in Japan, 49th in the world), Chemistry (6th in Japan, 41st in the world), Biology & Biochemistry (4th in Japan, 95th in the world), Immunology (4th in Japan, 68th in the world), and Pharmacology & Toxicology (4th in Japan, 76th in the world).

Weekly Diamond reported that Kyushu has the 16th highest research standard in Japan in terms of research funding per researchers in COE Program. In the same article, it is also ranked fifth in terms of the quality of education by GP funds per student.

Furthermore, Nikkei Shimbun on 2004/2/16 surveyed about the research standards in Engineering studies based on Thomson Reuters, Grants in Aid for Scientific Research and questionnaires to heads of 93 leading Japanese Research Centers, and Kyushu was placed 11th (research planning ability 10th) in this ranking.

Graduate school rankings
Eduniversal ranked Kyushu as 9th in the rankings of "Excellent Business Schools nationally strong and/or with continental links " in Japan.

Kyushu was ranked 12th in the number of successful candidates of the Japanese Bar Examination in 2009 and 15th in 2010 in Japan.

Alumni rankings
According to the Weekly Economist's 2010 rankings, graduates from Kyushu have the 53rd best employment rate in 400 major companies in Japan.

École des Mines de Paris ranks Kyushu University as 38th in the world in 2011 in terms of the number of alumni listed among CEOs in the 500 largest worldwide companies.

Popularity and selectivity
Kyushu is one of the most selective universities in Japan. Its entrance difficulty is usually considered one of the top in Japan.

Scholarships for international students
Kyushu offers a number of selected scholarships for international students. Some of them are:
Topia Leisure Scholarship (scholarship with work experience)
JASSO - Encourage privately financed international students learning costs
Fukuoka International Student Scholarship
Ushio Foundation Scholarship
Ajinomoto Scholarship
Sun Noh Scholarship

Evaluation from Business World

Notable people associated with Kyushu University

Chemistry, Physics and Engineering

 Kyozi Kawasaki (川崎 恭治), physicist, 2001 Boltzmann Medal winner.
 Genichi Taguchi (田口 玄一), engineer and statistician.
 Heitaro Nakajima, (中島 平太郎), digital audio pioneer, president Aiwa

Physiology or Medicine

 Inokichi Kubo (久保 猪之吉), pioneer of otorhinolaryngology.
 Ōmori Harutoyo (大森 治豊), surgeon and first president of the Fukuoka Medical College.
 Yutaka Ido (井戸 泰), surgeon, 1919 Nobel Prize in Physiology or Medicine nominee.
 Naosuke Onodera (小野寺 直助), surgeon, 1937 Nobel Prize in Physiology or Medicine nominee.
 Kazuo Yamafuji (山藤 一雄), scientist, 1964 Nobel Prize in Physiology or Medicine nominee.
 Hakaru Hashimoto (橋本 策), MD, PhD, medical scientist, discoverer of Hashimoto's thyroiditis.
 Masatoshi Nei (根井 正利), a Japanese-born American evolutionary biologist, 2013 Kyoto Prize winner.
 Yoshizumi Ishino (石野 良純), molecular biologist, known for his discovering the DNA sequence of CRISPR.
 Takehiko Sasazuki (笹月 健彦) MD, PhD emeritus professor,  professor of

Literature and History

 Junzo Shono (庄野 潤三), a Japanese novelist, 1954 Akutagawa Prize winner.
 Toshio Shimao (島尾 敏雄), a Japanese novelist, 1977 Yomiuri Prize winner.
 Kyoichi Katayama (片山 恭一), a Japanese author.
 Rizō Takeuchi (竹內 理三), historian
 Wolfgang Michel-Zaitsu, historian, first foreigner granted a tenure at a Japanese national university in 1984.
 Hsu Hsing-Ching (徐興慶), president of Chinese Culture University in Taiwan.
 Yasuhisa Hara (原 泰久), a Japanese cartoonist.
 Kyojin Onishi(大西巨人), a Japanese novelist, Malxist

Politics and Business

 Shinya Izumi(泉　信也) Politician 
 Robert T. Huang, SYNNEX Corporation founder

See also
National Seven Universities
Campus of Kyushu University 
Kyushu Institute of Design
Kyoto University
Maidashi kyudai byoin mae
IBM/Google Cloud Computing University Initiative
Experimentation on American POWs

References

External links

 
 Degree programs in English (G30)
 Graduate School of Law - Programs in English
 Guía de Ciudades: Fukuoka

 
Japanese national universities
National Seven Universities
Forestry education
1911 establishments in Japan
Educational institutions established in 1911